Toni Rajala (born March 29, 1991) is a Finnish professional ice hockey forward for EHC Biel of the National League (NL). He was drafted 101st overall by the Edmonton Oilers in the 2009 NHL Entry Draft.

Playing career
Rajala began playing junior hockey with the Ilves Tampere system in 2005–06.  By 2007–08, he had worked his way up to the Junior A level of the SM-Liiga, tallying 35 points in 33 games.  Rajala turned pro with Ilves Tampere in 2008–09, tallying 5 points in 21 games during his professional rookie season in the SM-Liiga.

Rajala was selected in the first round of the 2009 CHL Import Draft (14th overall) by the Brandon Wheat Kings of the Western Hockey League (WHL).  He joined the Wheat Kings for the 2009–10 WHL season.

On July 16, 2009, Rajala signed a two-way contract with the Edmonton Oilers.

With the impending 2012–13 NHL lockout, The Oilers directly assigned him to the Oklahoma City Barons of the American Hockey League on September 15, 2012.

On August 25, 2013, with the prospects of another season in the American minor leagues, Rajala opted to be mutually released from his contract with the Oilers and later returned to Europe to sign a one-year contract with Swedish Hockey League club, HV71 on October 15, 2013.

International play

Rajala debuted internationally for Finland at the 2008 IIHF World U18 Championships, recording 5 points in 6 games as Finland placed sixth.  The following year, he was named to Finland's under-20 team for the 2009 World Junior Championships in Ottawa, Ontario, Canada, and managed 3 points in 6 games; Finland finished in seventh place.

Later that year, in April 2009, Rajala competed for Finland at the 2009 IIHF World U18 Championships in the United States.  He led the tournament in scoring with ten goals and nine assists and broke the previous point record held by Alexander Ovechkin.  Rajala was selected as the best forward in the tournament, and was named to the tournament All-Star Team, helping Finland to a bronze medal.  Rajala also represented Finland at the 2010 World Junior Championships, which were held in Saskatchewan, Canada.

Career statistics

Regular season and playoffs

International

Awards and honours

References

External links

1991 births
Living people
People from Parkano
EHC Biel players
Brandon Wheat Kings players
Edmonton Oilers draft picks
Färjestad BK players
Finnish ice hockey right wingers
HV71 players
Ilves players
Luleå HF players
Oklahoma City Barons players
Stockton Thunder players
HC Yugra players
Ice hockey players at the 2022 Winter Olympics
Olympic ice hockey players of Finland
Medalists at the 2022 Winter Olympics
Olympic gold medalists for Finland
Olympic medalists in ice hockey
Sportspeople from Pirkanmaa